Osamudienwen Idehen (born 13 May 1990) is a Nigerian footballer. who plays as a striker for Buildcon F.C.

International career
He made his international debut for Nigeria on 3 March 2010, scoring a brace against Congo DR in a friendly match.

References

1990 births
Living people
People from Umuahia
Nigerian footballers
Nigeria international footballers
Nigerian expatriate sportspeople in Vietnam
Association football forwards
Enyimba F.C. players
Sunshine Stars F.C. players
V.League 1 players
Expatriate footballers in Vietnam
Nigerian expatriate footballers
Expatriate footballers in Zambia
Akwa United F.C. players
Haiphong FC players
Abia Warriors F.C. players
Buildcon F.C. players